The twelfth  series of Comedy Playhouse, the long-running BBC series, aired during 1972, with the last two episode being used as fillers due to the Munich massacre.

Background
The twelfth series, which was in colour, consisted of seven episodes, each of which had a different cast and storyline. The pilot episode of Are You Being Served? was intended to be broadcast early in the year but the BBC chose not to broadcast it, and was not transmitted, until the Munich massacre at the 1972 Summer Olympics necessitated that it was used as a filler.

Episodes

References
Mark Lewisohn, "Radio Times Guide to TV Comedy", BBC Worldwide Ltd, 2003
British TV Comedy Guide for Comedy Playhouse
Comedy Playhouse, a TV Heaven Review

Comedy Playhouse (series 12)